Hypericum tomentosum is a species of flowering plant of the St. John's wort family (Hypericaceae) that is found in the western Mediterranean.

Taxonomy 
The placement of H. tomentosum within Hypericum can be summarized as follows:

Hypericum
 Hypericum subg. Hypericum
 Hypericum sect. Adenosepalum
 subsect. Adenosepalum
 subsect. Aethiopica
 Huber-Morathii group
 subsect. Caprifolia
 H. caprifolium
 H. coadunatum
 H. collenetteae
 H. naudinianum
 H. psilophytum
 H. pubescens
 H. scruglii
 H. sinaicum
 H. somaliense
 H. tomentosum

References 

tomentosum
Taxa named by Carl Linnaeus